The Swedish Match Play Championship is a golf tournament played since 1904, held for both men and women. It is the oldest and most traditional golf tournament in Sweden. The name SM is shortening in Swedish language for "Svenska Mästerskapet" (the Swedish Championship).

History
From the first tournament in 1904 (for men) and 1911 (for women) until 1983, it was an amateur tournament, from 1910 open only for Swedish citizens, and the winner was the official Swedish champion. Since 1984, except 1985, the tournament has been open to both amateurs and professionals and for foreign citizens.

If a foreigner wins, the best placed Swedish player becomes Swedish champion of the year.

The men's tournament is part of the Swedish Golf Tour since 1986 and the Nordic Golf League since 1999. It featured on the Challenge Tour between 1990 and 1999. The women's tournament is part of the women's Swedish Golf Tour since 1986. 

The first tournament was held 9–10 October 1904, organized by Göteborgs Golfklubb (Gothenburg Golf Club) at the newly built 6 hole Hovås Course. Only players from the home club took part, despite there were two clubs in the country, one in Stockholm also.

From 1907 to 1966, the final in the men's tournament was played over 36 holes. In 1949 and in 1950, the men's tournament began with 36 holes stroke play, were the 8 best players qualified for the match play competition. From 1932 to 1983, the final in the women's tournament was played over 36 holes.

In 2012 the format was again changed from pure match play to 36 hole stroke play followed by match play for the 32 best men and 16 best women respectively.

In 2020, the men's and women's tournaments were, for the first time, played at different venues and at different dates.   

Most victories in the men's tournament are won by Elis Werkell, with six wins. Most victories in the women's tournament are won by Liv Wollin (née Forsell) with ten wins.

Swedish champion
Each year a Swedish champion award is given to the highest finishing Swede at the conclusion of the tournament. The Swedish Champion in the men's category has always came from the final match, except in 1997 and 2017, when Raimo Sjöberg (1997) and Joakim Rask (2017) finished as the highest finishing Swedes without making the final.

In the women's category, Karolina Andersson in 2002, Caroline Hedwall in 2007 and Ellen Hutchinson-Kay in 2022 were crowned Swedish champions without winning the tournament.

Winners

Men's winners

Women's winners

See also
Swedish Junior Matchplay Championship

Notes

References

External links
Coverage on the Swedish Golf Federation's official site: All winners (men)
Coverage on the Swedish Golf Federation's official site: All winners (women)
Coverage on the Challenge Tour's official site

Former Challenge Tour events
Swedish Golf Tour events
Swedish Golf Tour (women) events
Golf tournaments in Sweden
Recurring sporting events established in 1904
1904 establishments in Sweden